Siwan may refer to
 Sivan, a month of the Hebrew calendar
 The Welsh form of Joan (first name)
Siwan or Joan, Lady of Wales, the wife and consort of Llywelyn the Great, Prince of Wales
 Siwan (play), by Saunders Lewis
 Sewant, beads used as a currency by Native Americans
 Siwan (album), a musical orchestra project by Jon Balke, and featuring Amina Alaoui
 Siwan, Henan, a town in Xichuan County, Henan, China

India
 Siwan District, in the state of Bihar, India
 Siwan, Bihar, the headquarters of the Siwan district
 Siwan Subdivision, a subdivision of Siwan district
 Siwan block, a Community development block in Siwan district
 Siwan (Lok Sabha constituency), a parliamentary constituency in Bihar, India
 Siwan (Vidhan Sabha constituency), a Legislative constituency in Bihar, India
 , a railway junction station in the state of Bihar, India
 Siwan, a village in Uttar Pradesh, India

People
 People with given name Siwan
 Siwan, a Korean singer, member of boy group ZE:A
 Siwan Morris, Welsh actress